Andrew Jared Epenesa (born September 15, 1998) is an American football defensive end for the Buffalo Bills of the National Football League (NFL). He played college football at Iowa, and was drafted by the Bills in the second round of the 2020 NFL Draft.

High school career
Playing at Edwardsville High School in Edwardsville, Illinois, Epenesa garnered All-American honors in both football and track. His father, Eppy, walked on to the Iowa football team after moving from American Samoa, and A. J. showed leanings towards Iowa throughout the recruiting process. On January 17, 2016, Epenesa committed to Iowa. He became the highest-rated recruit to play for a Kirk Ferentz-led team at Iowa. He also played in the Army All-American Bowl and Polynesian Bowl after his senior year.

Epenesa also won Illinois state titles in discus throw his junior and senior years.

College career
After his freshman season, Epenesa was named to the All-Freshmen Big Ten team. Notably, his first college sack came against future Buffalo Bills teammate Josh Allen during a game against Wyoming.

Epenesa did not start any games during his sophomore season, but still broke into the double digits for sacks and returned a fumble recovery for a touchdown. His 11 sacks on the year led the Big Ten Conference, and his four fumble recoveries tied for the conference lead. He was named Big Ten Defensive Player of the Week after games against Iowa State and Illinois. Epenesa was named first-team All-Big Ten by the media and second-team by the coaches.

Before his junior season, Epenesa was projected as a first-round pick in the 2020 NFL Draft, with some estimations placing him as high as second. Scouts touted both his strength and work ethic on the field.  Following a junior season with 11.5 sacks, 4 forced fumbles, and 49 tackles, Epenesa announced that he would forgo his senior year and declare for the 2020 NFL Draft. After three seasons, he finished tied for 4th on Iowa's career sacks list.

Epenesa, who is of Samoan ethnicity, was named to the preseason Polynesian College Player of the Year Watch List in 2018 and 2019. He was one of five finalists for the award in 2018.

Professional career

The Buffalo Bills selected Epenesa in the second round, 54th overall, of the 2020 NFL Draft. He signed a four-year, $5.877 million contract, including a $1.834 million signing bonus, with the Bills on May 7, 2020.

In Week 3 of the 2020 season, Epenesa recorded his first career sack in a 35–32 win over the Los Angeles Rams, tackling quarterback Jared Goff during the first quarter.

Personal life
Epenesa's cousin, Jacob Tuioti-Mariner, is also a professional football player. Epenesa's second cousin is Riley Patterson, a kicker for the Jacksonville Jaguars.

NFL career statistics

Regular season

Postseason

References

External links 
 
 Iowa Hawkeyes bio

1998 births
Living people
American football defensive ends
Iowa Hawkeyes football players
People from Glen Carbon, Illinois
Players of American football from Illinois
Players of American football from Kansas
Sportspeople from Greater St. Louis
Buffalo Bills players
American sportspeople of Samoan descent